John David Holeman (born 1963) is a professional surfer. Holeman was inducted into the East Coast Surfing Hall Of Fame on January 13, 2012, at the Orange County Convention Center in Orlando, Florida.

Early life 

Holeman was born in Washington, D.C., in 1963 and moved to Florida in 1967. He began surfing at age five.

Surfing 

Holeman advanced through the East Coast ranks and took many NSSA and Eastern Surfing Association (ESA) titles before he turned pro in 1984, receiving the rookie of the year award.

Health issues 

Holeman contracted a virus that damaged his heart after a bout of pneumonia in 2002. He received a pacemaker and defibrillator at age 39. He had a heart transplant in 2003.

Coaching 

He started John Holeman Surf School in Satellite Beach to coach other surfers. In August of 2021, Holeman renamed his surf school to Air360 Surf School. Holeman currently works with beginners to intermediate surfers.

References

External links 
 Air360 Surf School 
 
 Lyn Dowling (February 22, 2012), "Cardiac Problem Can't Keep Gifted Surfer Off Waves Long", Florida Today
 East Coast Surfing Hall of Fame
 "John Holeman Surf School" May 11, 2012, The Side Wedge
 aerial, Encyclopedia of Surfing

American surfers
Living people
1963 births